Mark D. Herber is a British author of genealogy, London legal history and family history books. His first book, 'Ancestral Trails' won the 1997 CILIP McColvin prize for an outstanding work of reference.

Herber is also a professional solicitor.

Bibliography
 (1997) Ancestral Trails: The Complete Guide to British Genealogy and Family History.  
 (1998) Clandestine Marriages in the Chapel and Rules of the Fleet Prison 1680–1754 Part 1.  
 (1999) Clandestine Marriages in the Chapel and Rules of the Fleet Prison 1680–1754 Part 2. 
 (2001) Clandestine Marriages in the Chapel and Rules of the Fleet Prison 1680–1754 Part 3. 
 (1999) Legal London (A Pictorial History), Chichester: Phillimore. 
 (2002) Criminal London (A Pictorial History from Medieval Times to 1939), Chichester: Phillimore. 
 (2006) My Ancestor Was a Lawyer with Brian Brooks.

References

British genealogists
Fellows of the Society of Genealogists
Living people
Year of birth missing (living people)